Leushi is a rural locality (a selo) in Kondinsky District of Khanty-Mansi Autonomous Okrug, Russia.

Climate
Leushi has a subarctic climate (Köppen climate classification Dfc), with very cold winters and warm summers. Precipitation is moderate and is significantly higher in summer than at other times of the year.

References

Rural localities in Khanty-Mansi Autonomous Okrug